The Cattle King is an Australian biography of Sidney Kidman.

Idriess researched and wrote it through 1935. It was difficult for him to write, in part due to lack of help from Kidman.

Reception
It was one of Ion Idriess' best selling books.

References

External links
The Cattle King at Ion Idriess Fanpage
ABC Radio program on The Cattle King from 2011

1936 non-fiction books
Australian biographies
Biographies about businesspeople
Books by Ion Idriess
Cattle in literature
Angus & Robertson books